Emelie Lövgren (born 3 July 1990) is a Swedish football defender currently playing for Djurgården in the Damallsvenskan. In 2018, she became Swedish national champion with Piteå IF.

References

External links
 Emelie Lövgren at Piteå IF  
  (archive)
  (archive)
 

1990 births
Living people
Swedish women's footballers
Damallsvenskan players
Piteå IF (women) players
Women's association football defenders